The Texas Tennis Open was a professional tennis tournament for women. After some contradictory statements, the Women's Tennis Association (WTA) made it a late addition to the 2011 WTA Tour. It was played at the Hilton Lakes Tennis & Sports Club in Grapevine (near Dallas), Texas in the United States. It was an International level event in August during the same week (the week before the US Open) as the New Haven Open at Yale. In 2013, the event was cancelled from the WTA calendar due to economic reasons.

Finals

Singles

Doubles

References

External links
 

 
Hard court tennis tournaments
Defunct tennis tournaments in the United States
Recurring sporting events established in 2011
Recurring sporting events disestablished in 2013
2011 establishments in Texas
2013 disestablishments in Texas